The 1966 smallpox outbreak in the United Kingdom was an outbreak of mild smallpox which began with Tony McLennan, a photographer at the Medical School in Birmingham, which housed a smallpox laboratory and where 12 years later a fatal smallpox outbreak would occur, also beginning with a medical photographer.

References 

Smallpox epidemics
Smallpox outbreak in the United Kingdom